Darre or Darré is a surname. Notable people with the surname include:

Bernie Darre (1939–2006), American football guard
Hans Jørgen Darre (1803–1874), Norwegian clergyman
Jeanne-Marie Darré (1905–1999), French classical pianist
Niels Stockfleth Darre (1765–1809), Norwegian military officer
Niels Stockfleth Darre Eckhoff (1831–1914), Norwegian architect
Richard Walther Darré (1895–1953), SS-Obergruppenführer and leading Nazi Blut und Boden ideologist

See also
Hans Jørgen Darre-Jenssen (1864–1950), Norwegian engineer and politician
Worm Hirsch Darre-Jenssen (1870–1945), Norwegian engineer and politician
Tournous-Darré, a commune in the Hautes-Pyrénées department in southwestern France